Lagaleh (also Romanized as Lagāleh and Legāleh; also known as Lekāleh) is a village in Chenarud-e Shomali Rural District, Chenarud District, Chadegan County, Isfahan Province, Iran. At the 2006 census, its population was 123, in 32 families.

References 

Populated places in Chadegan County